The Union of Socialist Forces (Turkish: Sosyalist Güç Birliği) is an electoral alliance in Turkey, formed by Left Party (SOL), Communist Party of Turkey (TKP), Communist Movement of Turkey  (TKH) and Revolution Movement (DH) to contest the upcoming Turkish elections in 2023. The alliance was made public on the 21 August 2022. The alliance was announced alongside a supporting declaration, signed by 226 Turkish public figures, including intellectuals, authors, trade unionists, artists, lawyers and journalists.

Ideology
In their declaration document, the alliance offers five points as their ideological ground. These points are focused on forced nationalisation and anti-capitalism, societal equality and public ownership, anti-NATO and anti-American international policies, secularism and anti-clericalism, especially against Islamic sects in Turkey, and anti-discrimination in the Turkish society. The USF denotes that the Nation Alliance has "a right-wing, pro-business character" and "will not be able to solve the (real) problems of the country". The Alliance expressed that it is in favor of all peoples living in Turkey living their identities and cultures freely, and that the Kurdish people can express themselves as a people and live their culture and identities freely, but that they must continue their struggle to change Turkey together.

Composition

See also
Labour and Freedom Alliance
United June Movement

References

2022 establishments in Turkey
Far-left politics in Turkey
Left-wing political party alliances
Political parties established in 2022
Political party alliances in Turkey
Socialist parties in Turkey